Caledon George Du Pré (28 March 1803 – 7 October 1886)
was an English Conservative Party politician who sat in the House of Commons from 1839 to 1874.

Du Pré was the son of James Du Pré of Wilton Park Estate, Beaconsfield, and his wife Madelina Maxwell, daughter of Sir William Maxwell, 4th Baronet. His father was MP for Gatton, Aylesbury and Chichester. Du Pré was an officer in the 1st Life Guards and became a J.P. and Deputy Lieutenant for Buckinghamshire.

In February 1839, Du Pré was elected at a by-election as a Member of Parliament (MP) for Buckinghamshire.
He held the seat until the 1874 general election, when he did not stand for re-election.

Du Pré died at the age of 83.

Du Pré married his cousin Louisa Cornwallis Maxwell, daughter of Sir William Maxwell, 5th Baronet.

References

External links 
 

1803 births
1886 deaths
Conservative Party (UK) MPs for English constituencies
UK MPs 1837–1841
UK MPs 1841–1847
UK MPs 1847–1852
UK MPs 1852–1857
UK MPs 1857–1859
UK MPs 1859–1865
UK MPs 1865–1868
UK MPs 1868–1874